The TelefériQo (from teleférico and Quito), or TelefériQo Cruz Loma, is a gondola lift in Quito, Ecuador, running from the edge of the city centre up the east side of Pichincha Volcano to lookout Cruz Loma. The ascent takes about twenty minutes, traveling 2,237 linear metres.

Overview
The TelefériQo opened in July 2005. It is both a tourist attraction, and a gateway to hike to the summit of Pichincha, an active stratovolcano.

As of 2018, a photo ID is required to purchase a lift ticket, and the ticket stub must be retained for the return trip. This policy serves as a built-in alert system in case hikers do not return when expected.

Many photo opportunities and observation points await tourists at the top of the lift. Additionally, there is a public restroom, a small cafe, and a few shops; but much of the retail complex sits unoccupied.

Climate 
Due to the increased altitude and the wind on the mountain it is cooler than the city and is susceptible to fog, especially in the mornings. The height of the upper station is enough to cause symptoms of altitude sickness in some individuals.

The visitor centre at the base includes the VulQano Park amusement park, restaurants and food court, the world's highest go kart track, and other attractions.

External links 

Additional information

References

Tourist attractions in Quito
Transport in Quito
Gondola lifts